Fulgence Werner Le Roy (23 August 1924 – 14 October 2017) was a Catholic bishop.

Le Roy was ordained to the priesthood in 1952. He served as bishop of the Diocese of Pietersburg (renamed to Polokwane in 2009), South Africa, from 1988 to 2000. He died on 14 October 2017 at the age of 93.

See also
Catholic Church in South Africa

References

1924 births
2017 deaths
20th-century Roman Catholic bishops in South Africa
Roman Catholic bishops of Polokwane